Damien Diggs (born 1975/1976) is an American lawyer who is the nominee to serve as United States attorney for the Eastern District of Texas.

Education 

Diggs earned a Bachelor of Science degree in political science and government from Towson University in 1998 and a Juris Doctor from the Washington College of Law at American University in 2003.

Career 

In 2003 and 2004, Diggs served as a law clerk for Judge Rhonda Reid Winston on the Superior Court of the District of Columbia. From 2005 to 2007, he worked as an associate at Hogan Lovells in Washington, D.C.. Diggs served as a staff attorney in the United States Department of Education's Office for Civil Rights from 2007 to 2012. Diggs served as an assistant United States attorney in Washington D.C., from 2012 to 2018 and joined the Northern District of Texas in 2018.

Nomination as U.S. attorney 

In August 2022, Diggs was seen as a leading contender to be the U.S. attorney for the Eastern District of Texas. In October 2022, Senator Ted Cruz noted that Diggs' was allegedly snubbed by the Biden Administration when he was not nominated alongside other U.S. attorney nominees for the various Texas districts.  On February 1, 2023, President Joe Biden announced his intent to nominate Diggs to serve as the United States attorney for the Eastern District of Texas. On February 2, 2023, his nomination was sent to the United States Senate. His nomination is pending before the Senate Judiciary Committee. If confirmed, he would be the first African-American to serve as U.S. attorney in the Eastern District of Texas.

References 

1970s births
Living people
Year of birth missing (living people)
Place of birth missing (living people)
21st-century American lawyers
African-American lawyers
Assistant United States Attorneys
Lawyers from Washington, D.C.
People associated with Hogan Lovells
Texas lawyers
Towson University alumni
Washington College of Law alumni
United States Department of Education officials